Swane  is a surname. Notable people with the surname include:

Christine Swane (1876–1960), Danish painter
Erik Swane Lund (1923–2012), Danish fencer
Sigurd Swane (1879–1973), Danish painter and poet

See also
Shane (name)
Swan (disambiguation)